Laurence Chisholm Young (14 July 1905 – 24 December 2000) was a British mathematician known for his contributions to measure theory, the calculus of variations, optimal control theory, and potential theory.  He was the son of William Henry Young and Grace Chisholm Young, both prominent mathematicians. He moved to the US in 1949 but never sought American citizenship.

The concept of Young measure is named after him: he also introduced the concept of the generalized curve and a concept of generalized surface which later evolved in the concept of varifold. The Young integral also is named after him and has now been generalised in the theory of rough paths.

Life and academic career
Laurence Chisholm Young was born in Göttingen, the fifth of the six children of William Henry Young and Grace Chisholm Young. He held positions of Professor at the University of Cape Town, South Africa, and at the University of Wisconsin-Madison. He was also a chess grandmaster.

Selected publications

Books
, available from the Internet archive.
.
.

Papers
.
, memoir presented by Stanisław Saks at the session of 16 December 1937 of the Warsaw Society of Sciences and Letters. The free PDF copy is made available by the RCIN –Digital Repository of the Scientifics Institutes.
.
.
.
.
.
.
.
.

See also
Bounded variation
Caccioppoli set
Measure theory
Varifold

Notes

References

Biographical and general references

, including a reply by L. C. Young himself (pages 109–112).
.

Scientific references
. One of the most complete monographs on the theory of Young measures, strongly oriented to applications in continuum mechanics of fluids.
. A thorough scrutiny of Young measures and their various generalization is in Chapter 3 from the perspective of convex compactifications. 
.
.

External links

Obituary on University of Wisconsin web site 

20th-century British  mathematicians
Alumni of Trinity College, Cambridge
Mathematical analysts
Scientists from Göttingen
1905 births
2000 deaths
Variational analysts
British historians of mathematics
Instituto Nacional de Matemática Pura e Aplicada researchers